The number of stone inscriptions that have been found in Sri Lanka to date is over 4000. But these inscriptions are of different types. Considering their locations and their appearances, for the ease of studying, they are classified as follows:

1. Cave Inscriptions
2. Rock Inscriptions (Giri lipi)                                        
3. Slab Inscriptions (Puwaru lipi)
4. pile inscriptions (Tam lipi)

From the name itself, it's easy to understand what type of these inscriptions are.
Cave inscriptions can be found in Mihintale, Wessagiriya, Sithulpawwa, and Ritigala.
Some examples for the rock inscriptions are the Galwala inscription, the bilingual inscription found in Gadaladeniya and the Alawala inscription.
Polonnaruwa galpotha inscription, the Mihintale slab inscription, and the Thonigala inscription are examples for the slab inscriptions.
Badulla inscription and the Katugahagalge inscription are classified under pillar inscriptions.

Cave inscriptions are found to be the oldest type of inscriptions. They are inscribed below the drip ledge (katarama) of caves. These are seen almost in every cave belonging to the early period(20th-century A.C). At the beginning, the inscriptions had two or three short lines containing the information about donations made to bhikkus. But after the 2nd century A.C according to the Mihintale inscription, Jethavanaramaya Sanskrit inscription and Badulla pillar inscription the inscriptions have got lengthy descriptions. The inscription on the Abhayagiri terrace has 16 long lines. The inscription on the terrace of Dakunu Vihara is spread out on 17 slabs. Some inscriptions were produced in multiple copies. Thirteen copies of the Vevalkatiya inscription of Udaya IV were placed in various parts of the Rajarata. After the 10th century A.C these have become more descriptive because they contained appreciations made for some kings.
Some of the uses of these inscriptions are,
 to fill the gaps in some historic facts
 to get evidence for the historic facts
 to know information which have not been written in books
 to know about the ancient methods of controlling the temples
 to know the ancient methods of administrating the countries
 to know the old social traditions and customs
 to get information about the economy of ancient sri lanka
 to get a knowledge about the evolution of the language and the letters
 to get other cultural records
 to know different symbols used for different purposes
 to know sinhala grammar
 to know the names o the kings, rural kings and princes
 to know the designations of the royal officers
 to get an idea about the trade and industries in ancient country
 to get information about the religious activities and other religious beliefs

Evolution 

At the beginning the inscriptions had two or three short lines containing the information about donations made to bhikkhus. But after the 2nd century A.C according to the Mihintale inscription, Jethavanaramaya sanskrit inscription and Badulla pillar inscription the inscriptions have got lengthy descriptions. Inscription on Abhayagiri terrace has 16 long lines. The inscription on the terrace of Dakunu Vihara is spread out on 17 slabs. Some inscriptions were produced in multiple copies. Thirteen copies of the Vevalkatiya inscription of Udaya IV were placed in various part of the Rajarata. After the 10th century A.C these have become more descriptive because they contained appreciations made for some kings.
When considering the letters and the symbols used in the inscriptions, inscriptions written in different languages have been found. It is clear that people have used brahmi letters, Pali and Sanskrit to write these inscriptions. Here from these inscriptions information can be gathered in order to get a knowledge about the evolution of the sinhala letters and the development of the language, grammar rules, and structure.

Donations 

"දෙවනපිය මහ රක්ඛභ බරියය බකි(නිය) උපසික වරුණ(දත)ය(ලෙ)(ෙ)ණ"-The cave of Waruna Datta Upasika the sister of the queen of King Devanampiyatissa
"බඩගරික පරුමක කිස පුත පරුමක අශඩ ශුතඟ ලෙණෙ"-The cave of Ashanda gutta

These caves say the names of the people who made and donated the caves to the bhikkhus for their use. Because of these people could know the donor and his/her title, genealogy, profession, and status. When studying these inscriptions, it is clear that donation was not limited to kings and royalty, but also people of different classes. These forms of inscriptions written in pre-and-post-brahmi letters have been found in places such as Rajagirikanda and Aanaikkuttikanda.

Economy 

A single inscription can yield information on many different subjects. These inscriptions provide information about the economy of ancient Sri Lanka. Information like the old trade methods, the occupations and the economic stability of people, ownership of lands, types of taxes which cannot be extracted from the literary resources can be found from them. For example, Godawaya pillar inscription says about the taxes levied in the Godapawatha Harbour, Badulla Pillar Inscription says about the administration of an old market and Perimiyankulam inscription provides information about old trade grades and industries.

Society 

Stone inscriptions give facts about the spread of Buddhism, the spread of the civilization, and the spread of stone inscriptions. Moreover, they help us to understand how far the kings had power over the country. Inscriptions reveal information that is not written in literary sources. For example, Kaduruwewa inscription says about five generations of ministers.
When taking about the religious background, inscriptions provide information about bhikkhus, various religious beliefs and customs, administration of the temples, the lands owned by the temples and privileges. Mihintale pillar inscription, Abayagiriya sanskrit inscription and Kaludiya pokuna inscription tell about the administration of the temples and Sithulpawwa inscription says how the income gained by the judiciary was given to the temples.

One of the most important uses of these inscriptions is that the information contained in these are contemporary to a particular incident. Therefore the information written in the literary sources can be proven by the inscriptions.

Epigraphy
Sri Lanka inscriptions